DDRC may refer to:
 Diving Diseases Research Centre, a British hyperbaric medical organisation located in Plymouth
 Dharma Drum Retreat Center, a retreat center in New York founded by Ch'an Master Sheng-yen